Fabio Blanco Gómez (born 18 February 2004) is a Spanish footballer who plays as a right winger for FC Barcelona Atlètic.

Career
Blanco trained in the youth ranks at his hometown club UD Almería before moving to Valencia CF when he was 15. He played with Valencia until the end of the 2020-21 season when he allowed his contract to run down and became a free agent.
That summer he chose to join Eintracht Frankfurt, signing a contract until 2023 amidst reported interest from Bayern Munich, Real Madrid and Barcelona. 

However, after failing to settle in Germany and following a lot of upheaval to the back room staff in Frankfurt involving a new manager, sporting director and chairman, he signed for Barcelona in January 2022. He was given a two and half year contract with a €100m release clause. Barcelona were well placed in negotiations because they had appointed Jose Ramon Alexanko and Mateu Alemany as new head of La Masia and sporting director respectively, with both having previously worked with Blanco at Valencia.

In October 2022, along with Antonio Aranda, Emre Demir and Sergi Rosanas, Blanco was called into involvement with the first team squad training by first team Barcelona manager Xavi Hernandez.

International career
On 25 October 2022 playing for the Spanish under-19 age group team Blanco provided the assist for the goal by Real Madrid’s Cesar Palacios in a 1-0 win over Germany U19.

References

External links
 

2004 births
Living people
Spanish footballers
Association football midfielders
Footballers from Almería
FC Barcelona Atlètic players
Primera Federación players
Spain youth international footballers